"Somebody New" is a song by American band Joywave. It is the second single from their debut studio album How Do You Feel Now? and it also appeared on the band's second extended play How Do You Feel?. A music video for the song was uploaded to the band's YouTube Vevo channel on February 24, 2015. The song was performed on Jimmy Kimmel Live!, featured in promotional videos for X Games Austin 2015, and featured on the soundtrack for Pro Evolution Soccer 2016.

Music video
The official music video for the song, lasting three minutes and twenty-seven seconds, was uploaded to the band's Vevo channel on YouTube on February 24, 2015 and was directed by Keith Schofield. The video is mainly centered on skateboarding and also features CGI animation, which is used for scenes involving certain stunts and glitches involving the skateboarders in the video.

Track listing

Digital download

CD-R

Charts

Weekly charts

Year-end charts

Release history

References

2014 singles
2014 songs
Hollywood Records singles